Yosiwo Palikkun George (24 July 1941 – 13 August 2022) was a Micronesian politician, Vice President of the Federated States of Micronesia in the 19th (2015–2019) and 20th (2019–2022) terms of congress, under the presidencies of Peter M. Christian and David W. Panuelo.

Biography
George was born in Kosrae. He studied in the Universities of Guam and Hawaii and graduated in 1969.
He served as Lieutenant Governor of Kosrae from 1979 to 1980, and then director of the Department of Social Services which oversaw the education, health and social services systems of Micronesia. George served as Governor of Kosrae from January 1983 to January 1991, and later as ambassador to the United States, to Israel and to the United Nations. In 1997 George was elected to Congress of the Federated States of Micronesia where he served until 2001. He was then appointed as chief justice for the Kosrae State Supreme Court until 2006. In May 2015 George was again elected to the Congress of the Federated States of Micronesia, and also as Vice President of the Federated States of Micronesia. 

George was married to Antilise. He died from complications of COVID-19 in August 2022, at the age of 81.

References

External links

 Yosiwo P. George 8th Vice President Federated States of Micronesia – Office of the President

1941 births
2022 deaths
Vice presidents of the Federated States of Micronesia
Governors of Kosrae
Lieutenant Governors of Kosrae
Members of the Congress of the Federated States of Micronesia
Ambassadors of the Federated States of Micronesia to the United States
Permanent Representatives of the Federated States of Micronesia to the United Nations
Federated States of Micronesia diplomats
Federated States of Micronesia judges
University of New Mexico alumni
University of Hawaiʻi at Mānoa alumni
University of Guam alumni
Ambassadors of the Federated States of Micronesia to Israel
Deaths from the COVID-19 pandemic in Micronesia